Julie Pottinger (née Cotler; born January 12, 1970), better known by her pen name Julia Quinn, is a best-selling American author of historical romance fiction. Her novels have been translated into 41 languages, and have appeared on The New York Times Bestseller List 19 times. She has been inducted into the  Romance Writers of America Hall of Fame. Her Bridgerton series of novels has been adapted for Netflix by Shondaland under the title Bridgerton.

Early life and education
Quinn was born as Julie Cotler in 1970 to Jane and Stephen Lewis Cotler. She has three sisters: Emily, Abigail, and Ariana. She is Jewish. She was raised primarily in New England, although she spent much of her time in California following her parents' divorce.

Since her early childhood, Quinn thoroughly enjoyed books. At age 12, her father disagreed with her choices of reading material, Sweet Dreams and the Sweet Valley High book series, and told her she could keep reading them only if she could prove that they were good for her. She promptly told him that she was studying them in order to write one herself. Challenged to prove that she meant her statement, Quinn sat down at their computer and wrote her first two chapters. After finishing her novel three years later, she submitted it to Sweet Dreams, but was rejected.

Quinn graduated from Hotchkiss School and Harvard with a degree in Art History. During her senior year of college, she realized that she did not know what she wanted to do with her degree and decided to attend medical school. That decision required her to attend two additional years of college to complete the science prerequisites necessary to apply for medical school. She postponed medical school for two years while she wrote two more novels.

Career 
To occupy herself during the long days of studying science, Quinn began to write light-hearted Regency novels.  A few weeks after she was accepted to medical school, she discovered that her first two novels, Splendid and Dancing At Midnight, had been sold at auction, an unusual occurrence for a novice romance author. By the time Quinn finally entered Yale School of Medicine intending to become a doctor, three of her books had been published. After a few months of studying medicine, Quinn realized that she preferred writing to medical study. She left medical school and devoted herself full-time to her writing.

Quinn considers herself a feminist and gives her heroines feminist qualities that are not necessarily true to the most prevalent attitudes of the times her novels are set in. Her books are noted for their humor and sharp, witty dialogue. The novels are primarily character-driven, lacking the great external conflicts that many romance novels employ. One of her novels, When He was Wicked, was unusual for a romance novel, as the first four chapters describe the heroine in a happy marriage with someone who is not the hero, and then shows the death of the original husband and deals with the grief of both the heroine and hero before allowing the second love story to flourish.

Most of her books are dedicated to her husband, Paul Pottinger, often with references to amusing alternate titles for the work. Quinn won the Romance Writers of America RITA Award for 2007 for On the Way to the Wedding and again for 2008 for The Secret Diaries of Miss Miranda Cheever. When she won for 2010 for What Happens in London, she became (at the time) the youngest member and is now one of only 16 authors to be inducted into the RWA Hall of Fame.

In 2003, she enjoyed the rare honor of being profiled in Time Magazine, an accomplishment few romance novelists have achieved. In 2005 Publishers Weekly gave To Sir Phillip, With Love a rare starred review, and later named it one of the six best mass market original novels of the year.

Each of her last 17 novels has appeared on the New York Times Bestseller List, with Mr. Cavendish, I Presume hitting number one in October 2008. Most recently, The Girl With the Make-Believe Husband was on the NYT list in June 2017. Additionally to those, both her Lady Whistledown anthologies appeared on the NY Times list, as did both of her novel-in-three-part collaborations with Connie Brockway and Eloisa James (The Lady Most Likely and The Lady Most Willing), and the Bridgertons: Happily Ever After collection of Bridgerton’s second epilogues.

Her Bridgerton series of books has been adapted for Netflix by Shonda Rhimes under the title Bridgerton.

Personal life 
In 2001, Quinn won $79,000 on The Weakest Link. She is an avid reader and posts recommendations of her favorite books on her Facebook page. 

Quinn resides in Seattle, Washington, with her husband and two children. 

On June 29, 2021, Quinn's sister and father, Ariana Elise Cotler and Stephen Lewis Cotler, respectively, were killed by a drunk driver in Kaysville, Utah.

Bibliography

Splendid Trilogy 

 Splendid (1995)
 Dancing at Midnight (1995)
 Minx (1996)
 "A Tale of Two Sisters" in Where's My Hero? (2003, anthology with Lisa Kleypas and Kinley MacGregor)

Lyndon Sisters 

 Everything and the Moon (1997)
 Brighter Than the Sun (1997)

Agents of the Crown 

 To Catch an Heiress (1998)
 How To Marry a Marquis (1999)

Bridgerton series

The Duke and I (2000)
 The Viscount Who Loved Me (2000)
 An Offer From a Gentleman (2001)
 Romancing Mister Bridgerton (2002)
 To Sir Phillip, With Love (2003)
 When He Was Wicked (2004)
 It's In His Kiss (2005)
 On the Way to the Wedding (2006)
 The Bridgertons: Happily Ever After (2013)

Two Dukes of Wyndham
According to Quinn, this two-book set was based on the premise, "Two men say they’re the Duke of something. One of them must be wrong," inspired by a lyric from the Dire Straits song, "Industrial Disease". The events are concurrent and the plots are intertwined, with some scenes appearing in both books but from different perspectives.
 The Lost Duke of Wyndham (2008)
 Mr. Cavendish, I Presume (2008)

Bevelstoke series
 The Secret Diaries of Miss Miranda Cheever (2007)
 What Happens in London (2009)
 Ten Things I Love About You (2010)

Smythe-Smith quartet
 Just Like Heaven (2011)
 A Night Like This (2012)
 The Sum of All Kisses (2013)
 The Secrets of Sir Richard Kenworthy (2015)

Rokesby series
The Rokesby series is often considered a prequel series as it follows the  Rokesby and Bridgerton families.
 Because of Miss Bridgerton (2016)
 The Girl with the Make-Believe Husband (2017)
 The Other Miss Bridgerton (2018)
 First Comes Scandal (2020)

Lady Whistledown
The witty gossip columnist "Lady Whistledown" from the Bridgerton series ties together these two anthologies of interlinked novellas:
 "Thirty-Six Valentines" in The Further Observations of Lady Whistledown (2003, anthology with Suzanne Enoch, Karen Hawkins and Mia Ryan)
 "The First Kiss" in Lady Whistledown Strikes Back (2004, anthology with Suzanne Enoch, Karen Hawkins and Mia Ryan)

The Lady Most... 
 The Lady Most Likely... (December 28, 2010 a novel in three parts with Connie Brockway and Eloisa James)
 The Lady Most Willing... (December 26, 2012 a novel in three parts with Connie Brockway and Eloisa James)

Others
 "Gretna Greene" in Scottish Brides (June 1, 1999 an anthology with Christina Dodd, Stephanie Laurens and Karen Ranney)
 ". . . and a Sixpence in Her Shoe" in Four Weddings and a Sixpence (December 27, 2016 an anthology with Elizabeth Boyle, Stefanie Sloane and Laura Lee Guhrke)

Recognition 
1997 – Everything and the Moon nominated for Best Regency Historical by Romantic Times Magazine
2001 – Finalist in the Romance Writers of America's RITA Awards
2002 – Romancing Mister Bridgerton voted one of the top ten books of the year by RWA membershipFinalist for the RWA RITA Awards in the Long Historical category
2002 – To Sir Phillip, With Love named one of the six best mass market original novels of the year by Publishers Weekly
2003 – Quinn was profiled in Time magazine
2007 – Received Romance Writers of America RITA Award for Best Long Historical Romance, for On the Way to the Wedding
2008 – Received Romance Writers of America RITA Award for Best Regency Historical Romance, for The Secret Diaries of Miss Miranda Cheever
2010 – Received Romance Writers of America RITA Award for Best Regency Historical Romance for What Happens in London
2010 – Quinn was inducted into the Romance Writers of America Hall of Fame
2016 – Quinn taught the inaugural romance writing course at the Yale Summer Writers Conference

References

External links
 Official Julia Quinn Website
 Chapter excerpts and title list (Official publisher web page)

1970 births
Living people
American women novelists
American romantic fiction writers
Jewish American novelists
Novelists from Washington (state)
Hotchkiss School alumni
Harvard University alumni
RITA Award winners
Pseudonymous women writers
20th-century American novelists
20th-century American women writers
21st-century American novelists
21st-century American women writers
20th-century pseudonymous writers
21st-century pseudonymous writers
21st-century American Jews
Place of birth missing (living people)